Isaac Clinton Kline (August 18, 1858 – December 2, 1947) was a Republican member of the U.S. House of Representatives from Pennsylvania.

Biography
He was born in Mount Pleasant, Pennsylvania.  He attended the State Normal School in Bloomsburg, Pennsylvania, and Bucknell Academy in Lewisburg, Pennsylvania.  He graduated from Lafayette College in Easton, Pennsylvania, in 1893.  He taught school five years before entering college.  He studied law, was admitted to the bar in 1894 and commenced practice in Sunbury, Pennsylvania.

Kline was an unsuccessful candidate for election in 1912, but was elected as a Republican to the Sixty-seventh Congress.  He was an unsuccessful candidate for reelection in 1922.  He resumed the practice of his profession in Sunbury, and died in DeLand, Florida.  Interment in Pomfret Manor Cemetery, in Sunbury.

Sources

The Political Graveyard

1858 births
1947 deaths
People from Mount Pleasant, Pennsylvania
Pennsylvania lawyers
Bloomsburg University of Pennsylvania alumni
Republican Party members of the United States House of Representatives from Pennsylvania